Kalat was a first-class cricket team from the Pakistani city of Kalat in the north of Baluchistan province, about 150 kilometres south of Quetta. They had one season of first-class cricket in 1969–70, playing two matches in the Quaid-e-Azam Trophy.

First-class matches
The Quaid-e-Azam Trophy was expanded from a 12-team tournament in 1968–69 to a 20-team tournament in 1969–70, and Kalat were one of the new teams.

Their two matches took place in the space of 11 days in August 1969. Both were played at the Racecourse Ground in Quetta, and Kalat lost both by an innings. In the first match Kalat made 127 and 87 against Quetta, who declared at 402 for 8. In the second match Public Works Department declared at 524 for 4, and dismissed Kalat for 126 and 102.

Nineteen players appeared for Kalat in the two matches, and there were two captains. No batsman totalled 100 runs, and no bowler took five wickets. The highest score was 52 by Abdul Jabbar in the match against Quetta.

When the Quaid-e-Azam Trophy was reduced to an 18-team tournament for 1970–71, Kalat dropped out.

Players
Players who appeared for Kalat in the 1969–70 Quaid-e-Azam Trophy first-class matches are listed below:

Current status
Kalat currently compete in the annual sub-first-class Inter-District Senior Tournament against other teams from Baluchistan province. They play their home matches at various grounds in Quetta.

References

Other sources
 Wisden Cricketers' Almanack 1970 to 1972

Pakistani first-class cricket teams
Former senior cricket clubs of Pakistan
Cricket in Balochistan, Pakistan